Fordongianus, (Ancient Greek: Hydata Hypsitana,  or Forum Trajani,) is a comune (municipality) in the Province of Oristano in the Italian region Sardinia, located about  northwest of Cagliari and about  northeast of Oristano.

Fordongianus borders the following municipalities: Allai, Busachi, Ghilarza, Ollastra, Paulilatino, Siapiccia, Villanova Truschedu.

History
In antiquity, Fordongianus was called Forum Trajani in honor of Roman emperor Trajan, who is credited with the building of what are now considerable Roman remains, including those of a bridge, and of thermae on a scale of great magnificence (Valéry, Voy. en Sardaigne, vol. ii. c. 35). The city, in the interior of Sardinia, is known from the Itineraries, which place it on the road from Tibula, through the interior of the island, to Othoca. (Itin. Ant. p. 82.)

Demographic evolution

References

External links

 www.comunefordongianus.it/

Spa towns in Italy

Cities and towns in Sardinia